Marantochloa mildbraedii is a species of plant in the Marantaceae family. It is found in Cameroon, Central African Republic, Equatorial Guinea, Republic of Congo (Brazzaville) and Gabon. Its natural habitat is subtropical or tropical moist lowland forests. It is threatened by habitat loss.

References

mildbraedii
Endangered plants
Flora of West-Central Tropical Africa
Taxonomy articles created by Polbot